Linda Zou is a professor of Civil Infrastructure and Environmental Engineering from Khalifa University, Abu Dhabi, United Arab Emirates. Prof. Zou has received contribution to her work on nanotechnology to accelerate water condensation from the National University of Singapore and the University of Belgrade. Zou has developed a new aerosol material for use in cloud seeding: salt crystals coated in titanium dioxide nanoparticles.

The technique developed by Prof. Zou was used in the January 2020 Cloud Seeding experiment in the UAE.

References

Living people
Year of birth missing (living people)